James Ronald Garcia (March 7, 1944) is a former professional American football player who played defensive lineman for four seasons for the Cleveland Browns, New York Giants, New Orleans Saints, and Atlanta Falcons.

References

1944 births
Living people
Players of American football from Chicago
American football defensive linemen
Atlanta Falcons players
Cleveland Browns players
New Orleans Saints players
New York Giants players
Purdue Boilermakers football players